Nogometni klub Zreče, commonly referred to as NK Zreče or simply Zreče, is a Slovenian football club based in the town of Zreče. The club was established in 1961.

Honours
Slovenian Fourth Division
 Winners: 1994–95, 2002–03, 2008–09, 2016–17

MNZ Celje Cup
 Winners: 2008–09

League history since 1992

References

Association football clubs established in 1961
Football clubs in Slovenia
1961 establishments in Slovenia